Mohegan Sun is an American casino, owned and operated by the Mohegan Tribe on  of their reservation, along the banks of the Thames River in Uncasville, Connecticut. It has  of gambling space.  

It is in the foothills of southeastern Connecticut, where 60 percent of the state's tourism is concentrated. It features the 12,000-seat capacity Mohegan Sun Arena, home of the Women's National Basketball Association's Connecticut Sun. It is also where the studio of WMOS is located.

The casino contains slot machines, gaming tables including poker, blackjack, craps, roulette, Caribbean stud poker, keno and baccarat. The race book offers live horse or greyhound racing from around the U.S. as well as from Australia and England. It also offers wagering on jai-alai from Florida.

The economic recession that began in 2007 took a heavy toll on receipts. By 2012 both the Mohegan Sun and nearby competitor Foxwoods Resort Casino (owned by the Mashantucket Pequot) were deeply in debt.

At the end of the 2018 fiscal year, Mohegan Sun's net revenue was $1.07 billion.

History

Development and construction 
The development of the Mohegan Sun began in 1992 with RJH Development and LMW Investments of Connecticut, and Slavik Suites Inc. proposed the idea of developing a casino with the Mohegan tribe. The three companies formed Trading Cove Associates (TCA), which provided the Mohegans with financial support, tribal attorneys, and advisers to assist in the tribe's effort to gain official recognition as a people. In March 1994 they gained federal recognition as a sovereign people, opening the way to develop a casino. The land, formerly used by United Nuclear Corporation building nuclear reactors for submarines, was decommissioned and cleaned up. Sol Kerzner, head of Kerzner International (formerly Sun International), became involved with a 50 percent interest in TCA. Waterford Gaming had the other 50 percent interest in TCA. The Mohegan Tribal Gaming Authority (MTGA) hired TCA to oversee development and construction of the casino.

The casino and resort first opened on October 12, 1996. In 2000, Trading Cove Associates gave complete control of the resort to the Mohegan tribe, although under the terms of the agreement TCA continued to receive a 5% dividend on the gross revenue generated by Mohegan Sun until 2014.

Attempted unionization 
In 2012, Mohegan Sun table games dealers attempted to unionize through an affiliation with United Auto Workers (UAW), which represents dealers at Foxwoods Resort Casino. While the Mohegan Chief of Staff Chuck Bunnell later stated that tribal law allowed and created regulations for organizing, the UAW Region 9A Director sent a letter to eastern Connecticut elected officials, detailing efforts to unionize and asking for a signed letter of support. Shortly after, a letter was sent out by Mohegan Sun Connecticut President and CEO Jeff Hartmann and Mohegan Tribal Chairman Bruce "Two Dogs" Bozsum, telling employees that unions were not in their best interest, and a union would violate trust with management. The effort did not amount to unionization, with the international representative of the UAW, Karen Rosenberg, later stating, "The Mohegan Sun discouraged them from unionization and was successful."

COVID-19 closure and re-opening 
Mohegan Sun closed for the first time since its opening in 1996 on March 17, 2020, due to the COVID-19 pandemic. Both Mohegan Sun and Foxwoods were major sources of the rise in unemployment in Connecticut during the pandemic, due to thousands of employees being furloughed or laid off. Although June 1, 2020, was set as a reopening date for both Mohegan Sun and Foxwoods, Governor Ned Lamont expressed concern that the nation's halting progress in fighting the pandemic did not yet warrant such freedoms from mitigation as take place in bars and casinos and discouraged the tribes from reopening the venues. Both Mohegan Sun and Foxwoods had limited re-openings on June 1, 2020. In response, the state had electric signage put on the roadways leading to the casinos, discouraging people from going.

Features

The Casino of the Sky has a planetarium-like domed ceiling utilizing fiber optics to display the sun, moon, and stars (though not in actual star patterns), accompanying the lighting effects of the Wombi Rock, which is a three-story high crystal mountain crafted of alabaster and more than 12,000 individual plates of hand-selected onyx from quarries in Iran, Pakistan, and Mexico; which were transported to Carrara, Italy and fused into glass.
 The decor is Native American in style in many aspects. The artwork throughout the casino and the structural design has Native American feel. In addition, several mechanical wolves stand high atop rock structures inside the gaming areas that occasionally sit back and howl lightly.  In many ways it reflects the four seasons: (Winter, Spring, Summer & Fall)  The casino uses a tribal theme for its playing cards.  Each suit represents a 20th-century Native American as well as one of the four seasons.
 A new buffet called the Seasons Buffet replaced both the Seasons and Sunburst Buffet.
 In the Fall of 2014, Mohegan Sun exclusively partnered with Blade to provide helicopter transportation between Manhattan and the Uncasville, CT casino.
Comix Comedy Club relocated from Foxwoods to Mohegan Sun in late Summer of 2015.
The Earth Tower, officially opened on November 18, 2016, is a 400-room, 242,000 square-foot hotel tower.

Gaming
The gaming floor has 6,500 slot machines, 377 table games as well as a racebook.

The table games at Mohegan Sun range from 116 blackjack tables, craps, roulette, baccarat, and 3-card poker. They also offer video game blackjack, craps, and roulette.

Economic impact
Mohegan Sun employs around 8,000 local employees, bringing in $1.07 billion in revenues in 2018. Concerts and boxing events bring further temporary employment and revenues. The casino also submits about 25% of its revenues from slot machines to the State of Connecticut.  However, this impact has not been without costs to the tribe and local communities.  The Mohegan Tribe is $1.6 billion in debt while local communities have complained about increased local costs for services associated with casino-related traffic, crime and social welfare service demands.

Expansion

Local
In November 2006, the tribe announced a $740 million expansion titled Project Horizon. The project was originally scheduled to be completed in 2010, with phases of the expansion being completed prior to that. The expansion included the "Casino of the Wind," which opened in August 2008 and features 650 slot machines, 28 table games, and 42-table poker room. It would have also added 1,000 new hotel rooms, including 300 House of Blues themed rooms, accessible through a separate lobby. However, in September 2008, Mohegan Sun placed the Project Horizon expansion on hold, due to the economic recession affecting the regional gaming markets. The feasibility of the expansion would be reevaluated within a year. However, in 2010, the tribe had a $58.1 million impairment charge which halted any work on the project. Project Horizon was eventually terminated.

In May 2011, Mohegan Sun announced that the casino would be expanded by building a new 300- to 500-room hotel. The expansion would accommodate the growing demand of hotel rooms at the casino. The Mohegans would let a third-party developer construct and own the new facility, unlike the existing hotel which is owned and operated by the Mohegan Tribal Gaming Authority. However, ground was never broken on the project.

Expansion plans were once again announced on June 24, 2013 for a $50 million, 200,000-square foot "Downtown District," to be built next to the Uncasville casino's Winter Garage, featuring a New England-themed food pavilion; a 14-screen Marquee Cinemas multiplex; an upscale bowling-and-dining facility; and a promenade of retail shops whose tenants will include Coach, Tiffany, Sephora, Tommy Bahama, Puma and others. On July 28, 2014, Mohegan Sun announced it expected to break ground by the end of the year on a $110 million, 400-room hotel at Mohegan Sun. The hotel would be financed and built by a third-party developer and then leased back to Mohegan Sun to operate. Construction was due to start by the end of the year and be opened 18–20 months afterward. It also reported plans to add a $50 million nongaming “Downtown District” addition to the casino were advancing. The project would be owned and operated by the developers.

On November 18, 2016, Mohegan Sun opened The Earth Tower, a $139 million hotel which was the second at Mohegan Sun. The 400-room, 242,000 square foot hotel would be connected to the Casino of the Earth.

Mohegan Pennsylvania

On January 25, 2005, Mohegan Sun acquired its first gaming venture outside of Connecticut with its $280 million purchase of the Pocono Downs Racetrack in Plains Township, Pennsylvania, from Penn National Gaming. Mohegan Sun renamed the property "Mohegan Sun at Pocono Downs" (later Mohegan Sun Pocono and now Mohegan Pennsylvania) and began a major expansion. Operation as the first slots casino in the state of Pennsylvania commenced in November 2006.

Plans for Mohegan Sun, Massachusetts
On August 2, 2007, the Mohegan Tribal Gaming Authority purchased  of land in the town of Palmer, Massachusetts, a town in eastern Hampden County, with about 12,000 residents. The land is directly off of exit 8 of the Massachusetts Turnpike. At the time, they had plans to build a retail center and it was unknown if a casino or any type of gaming would be allowed to occur. A month later on September 17, 2007, Massachusetts Governor Deval Patrick unveiled a proposal to license three full-scale casinos in the state in a bidding process. The locations would be in the western, southeastern, and Boston area of the state. Both the Massachusetts House of Representatives and Senate passed legislation to allow casinos in the state, but Governor Patrick refused to sign the legislation due to his objections to allowing slot machines at race tracks. Prospects for legalizing casinos in the state were on hold until after the next legislative session began in January 2011. In June 2011, House Speaker Robert A. DeLeo said that a bill to legalize casinos would be taken up by state legislators in July pending the outcome of talks with Governor Patrick. In November 2011, Patrick signed the bill allowing three full-scale casinos and one slot machine parlor in the state.

The Palmer casino plans were put in limbo after voters rejected the proposal for a $1 billion casino by a 93-vote margin. A recount of the 5221 votes cast on November 26, 2013 affirmed the rejection by an additional vote resulting in a 94-vote margin. The Quaboag Hills Chamber of Commerce endorsed the destination resort project and the economic benefits for the region.

Mohegan Sun is also competing for a license to develop and operate a casino resort near Boston at the Suffolk Downs racetrack. The plans called for about 4,000 slot machines, 100 table games, and a poker room on a 42-acre piece of land in the Revere-side of the property. A referendum in Revere to approve a revised host community agreement for the proposal was passed on February 25, 2014 after the first proposed agreement for a plan that straddled the border of two communities was rejected by one—East Boston—and approved by the other—Revere. A deal was then made with Boston Mayor Martin Walsh to pay $75 million in capital improvements to East Boston and Boston and $18 million a year in payments to the city should Mohegan get the license. The final outcome depends on firstly, the Massachusetts Gaming Commission decision on September 12, 2014, for which site—Mohegan Sun, Revere or Wynn Resorts, Everett—will be issued a license, and secondly, a statewide referendum on the November 2014 ballot attempting to overturn the 2011 law allowing casino gambling in Massachusetts.

New York
In May 2011, Mohegan Sun announced plans to expand into New York with a casino in the Catskills. The casino would have taken over the Concord Resort development in the town of Thompson, New York. The deal for this casino, however, fell through when the New York Gaming Commission picked other locations.

Atlantic City
In August 2012, the tribe announced an agreement to take over management of the Resorts Casino Hotel in Atlantic City, New Jersey.

Canada

On June 11th 2019, the Mohegan tribe also took over management of the Casino Niagara and Fallsview Casino casinos in Niagara Falls, Ontario.

South Korea
In May 2018, the tribe announced an agreement to buy out its international development partner in building a 1,350-room hotel casino at Incheon International Airport near Seoul, South Korea.  The tribe reported a plan to spend $100 million on the project in 2018. In December 2018, the tribe signed an agreement with Paramount Pictures to build the world's first Paramount-branded theme park in Inspire Integrated Resort.

In popular culture
Mohegan Sun, as well as Mohegan Sun Pocono, were featured in a 2014 episode of Undercover Boss, in which then chairman of the Mohegan Tribe, Bruce "Two Dogs" Bozsum, was featured as the boss of episode, working at the casinos in disguise.

The climax of the 2019 film Uncut Gems is both set at, and was filmed on location at, Mohegan Sun.

The music video for Ariana Grande's single "Monopoly" was filmed at Mohegan Sun. Shot during Grande's passage by Uncasville, Connecticut, in the hours leading up to a Sweetener World Tour concert scheduled that night. The video has amassed over 50 million views on YouTube.

See also
Gambling in Connecticut 
List of casinos in the United States
Native American gaming

Notes

External links
Official website
Mohegan Tribal Gaming Authority
Mohegan Sun at Pocono Downs Racetrack & Slots
Waterford Gaming
Kerzner International
Hirsch Bedner Associates

1996 establishments in Connecticut
Casinos in Connecticut
Resorts in the United States
Skyscraper hotels in Connecticut
Buildings and structures completed in 1996
Casinos completed in 1996
Hotel buildings completed in 1996
Native American casinos
Kohn Pedersen Fox buildings
Tourist attractions in New London County, Connecticut
Buildings and structures in New London County, Connecticut
Skyscrapers in Connecticut
Montville, Connecticut
Casino hotels
Mohegan
Native American history of Connecticut